USS O-13 (SS-74) was an O-class submarine of the United States Navy.  Her keel was laid down on 6 March 1916 by the Lake Torpedo Boat Company in Bridgeport, Connecticut.

The later O-boats (O-11 through O-16) were designed by Lake Torpedo Boat to different specifications from the earlier ones designed by Electric Boat. They performed much less well, and are sometimes considered a separate class.

Construction and career
O-13 was launched on 27 December 1917 sponsored by Miss Margaret Arletta Adams. While conducting submerged trials in Long Island Sound on 5 October 1918, prior to her commissioning, O-13 rammed , the section patrol boat accompanying her, during a submerged circular run off Bridgeport, Connecticut, holing Mary Alice amidships. Although Mary Alice sank within minutes, O-13 rescued her entire crew, including Captain William A. Gill, President of the U.S. Navy's Board of Inspection and Survey, who had been embarked on Mary Alice.

O-13 was commissioned at New York City on 27 November 1918. O-13 operated along the coast of New Jersey and New York until 8 October 1919, when she arrived Philadelphia Navy Yard for a five-month overhaul. After returning to Cape May, New Jersey, on 8 March 1920, she departed on 1 April for duty in the Caribbean Sea. Steaming via Key West, Florida, and Havana, Cuba, she arrived Coco Solo, Panama Canal Zone, on 30 April.

For over three years O-13 operated out of the Submarine Base at Coco Solo both in the Caribbean Sea and in the Pacific Ocean.  Cruises sent her to ports in Colombia, Ecuador, and Peru while assigned to Submarine Division 10. Thence, she sailed on 15 October 1923 for the United States, arriving at Philadelphia, Pennsylvania, on 8 November. O-13 decommissioned there on 11 June 1924 after just five and a half years of service, and was placed in reserve. Her name was struck from the Naval Vessel Register on 9 May 1930, and her hull was sold for scrap on 30 July 1930.

References 

Department of the Navy Naval History and Heritage Command Online Library of Selected Images: Civilian Ships: Mary Alice (Steam Yacht, 1897). Served as USS Mary Alice (SP-397) in 1917-1918
NavSource Online: Section Patrol Craft Photo Archive: Mary Alice (SP 397)

External links
 

Ships built in Groton, Connecticut
1917 ships
United States O-class submarines
Maritime incidents in 1918